This is a list of notable jazz festivals around the world.

Historic jazz festivals

Jazz festivals by country

The following is an incomplete list of notable jazz festivals, including both current and defunct festivals of note.

Africa

Angola
 Luanda International Jazz Festival in Luanda

Cabo Verde

 Kriol Jazz Festival in Praia, Cabo Verde

Lesotho
Morija Arts & Cultural Festival in Morija
Madagascar
 Nosy Be Jazz Festival

Morocco
 Tanjazz in Tangier

Nigeria
Lagos International Jazz Festival in Lagos
Music Week Africa

South Africa
 Cape Town International Jazz Festival in Cape Town
 National Youth Jazz Festival in Grahamstown
 Standard Bank Joy of Jazz in Johannesburg

Americas

Argentina
Bolson Jazz Festival in El Bolson, Rio Negro
Buenos Aires Jazz Festival in Buenos Aires
Córdoba Jazz Fest in Córdoba, Córdoba Province
Festival Mar del Plata de Jazz in Mar del Plata, Buenos Aires Province
Festival de Jazz de Santa Fe in Santa Fe, Santa Fe Province
Festival Salta Jazz in Salta, Salta Province

Aruba
Caribbean Sea Jazz Festival

Barbados

Barbados Jazz Festival
Barbados Jazz Excursion

Bolivia
Bolivia FestiJazz Internacional in La Paz, Santa Cruz de la Sierra, El Alto, and Sucre

Brazil
Sao Paulo Jazz Festival in Sao Paulo
Fest Bossa & Jazz in Rio Grande do Norte
Búzios Jazz & Blues in Búzios
Circuito Do Jazz, Sampa Jazz, Olinda Jazz in São Paulo, Olinda
Festival Pró-Jazz in Juiz de Fora
I Love Jazz in Belo Horizonte
Paraty Bourbon Street Festival in Paraty
Rio Das Ostras Jazz & Blues in Rio Das Ostras
Tudo é Jazz in Ouro Preto
Tudo é Jazz no Porto in Rio de Janeiro
Valadares Jazz Festival in Governador Valadares

Canada

Halifax Jazz Festival in Halifax, Nova Scotia
Beaches International Jazz Festival in Toronto
Burlington Jazz and Blues Festival in Burlington, Ontario
Downtown Oakville Jazz Festival in Oakville, Ontario
Festi Jazz International de Rimouski, Rimouski, Quebec
Festival de Jazz & Blues de Saguenay in Quebec
Guelph Jazz Festival in Guelph, Ontario
Harvest Jazz and Blues Festival in Fredericton, New Brunswick
Jazz Sudbury Festival in Greater Sudbury, Ontario
Kaslo Jazz Festival in Kaslo, British Columbia
Kensington Market Jazz Festival in Toronto
L'OFF Festival de Jazz de Montréal in Montreal
Montreal International Jazz Festival in Montreal
Ottawa Jazz Festival in Ottawa
Roots and Blues Jazz Festival in Salmon Arm, BC
Sasktel Saskatchewan Jazz Fest in Saskatoon, Regina, and Prince Albert in Saskatchewan
TD Edmonton International Jazz Festival in Edmonton, Alberta
Toronto Downtown Jazz Festival in Toronto, Ontario
Uptown Waterloo Jazz Festival in Waterloo, Ontario
Vancouver International Jazz Festival in Vancouver
Victoria International JazzFest in Victoria, British Columbia
 Winnipeg International Jazz Festival in Winnipeg, Manitoba
 Wreckhouse International Jazz and Blues Festival in St John's, Newfoundland

Chile
 Festival Internacional de Jazz Las Condes in Santiago
Festival Internacional Jazz Patagonia in Frutillar
Festival Internacional Providencia Jazz in Santiago
Festival Internacional San Bernardo Jazz Fest in Santiago

Colombia
Utopía Jazz Festival in Cali
aJazzGo in Cali
BarranquiJazz in Barranquilla
Festival Internacional de Jazz del Teatro Libre in Bogotá
Jazz al Parque in Bogotá
Medejazz in Medellin
Pastojazz in Pasto

Cuba
Havana Jazz Festival in Havana

Curaçao
Curaçao North Sea Jazz Festival

Dominican Republic
Dominican Republic Jazz Festival

Haiti
Haiti Jazz Fest
Port-au-Prince International Jazz Festival

Jamaica
Jamaica Jazz and Blues Festival
Ocho Rios Jazz Festival

Mexico
Cancun Jazz Festival in Riviera Maya
Riviera Maya Jazz Festival in Playa del Carmen
Eurojazz festival CENART

Panama 
 Panama Jazz Festival

Saint Lucia
Saint Lucia Jazz Festival

Suriname
Suriname Jazz Festival in Paramaribo

Trinidad and Tobago
Jazz Artists on the Greens Trinidad
Tobago Jazz Festival

United States

Alabama
AJHoF Annual Student Jazz Festival in Birmingham
Gulf Coast Ethnic and Heritage Jazz Festival in Mobile
Taste of 4th Avenue Jazz Festival in Birmingham
W. C. Handy Music Festival in Florence

Alaska
Sitka Jazz Festival in Sitka
UAF Jazz Fest in Fairbanks

Arkansas
Fort Smith Jazz Festival in Fort Smith

California
Banjo Jubilee Jazz Festival in San Jose
Berkeley Jazz Festival in Berkeley
Big Easy Jazz Festival in San Jose
Brian Culbertson's Napa Valley Jazz Getaway in Napa Valley
Brubeck Festival in Stockton
Cavalcade of Jazz in Los Angeles
Concord Jazz Festival in Concord
Davis Jazz Festival in Davis
Folsom Jazz Festival in Folsom
Hardly Strictly Bluegrass in San Francisco
Healdsburg Jazz Festival in Healdsburg
Hyatt Regency Newport Beach Jazz Festival in Newport Beach
Monterey Jazz Festival in Monterey
Newport Beach Jazz Party
Playboy Jazz Festival in Hollywood Bowl, Los Angeles
Russian River Jazz and Blues Festival in Guerneville
Sacramento Banjo-Rama Jazz Festival in Sacramento 
Sacramento Jazz Jubilee in Sacramento
San Diego Thanksgiving Dixieland Jazz Festival in San Diego
San Francisco Blues Festival
San Francisco Jazz Festival in San Francisco
San Jose Jazz Festival in San Jose
Stanford Jazz Festival in Palo Alto
West Coast Jazz Party
Yosemite International Jazz Festival in Coarsegold

Colorado
Denver Vintage Jazz Festival in Denver
Evergreen Jazz Festival in Evergreen
Jazz Aspen Snowmass in Aspen
Telluride Jazz Festival in Telluride
Vail Jazz Festival in Vail

Connecticut
Greater Hartford Festival of Jazz in Hartford
Hartford International Jazz Festival in Hartford
 Hot Steamed Jazz Festival in Essex
Litchfield Jazz Festival in Goshen
New Haven Jazz Festival in New Haven

Delaware
Clifford Brown Jazz Festival in Wilmington

District of Columbia
DC Jazz Festival
Washington Women in Jazz Festival

Florida
Clearwater Jazz Holiday
Encore Holiday Jazz Festival
 Jacksonville Jazz Festival in Jacksonville
Jazz In The Bay
Jazz on the Green in Fort Myers
Suncoast Jazz Classic in Clearwater Beach
Tampa Bay Blues Fest
Wesley Chapel Jazz Festival

Georgia
Atlanta Jazz Festival in Atlanta
The Atlanta Jazz Party in Atlanta
Labor Day Pop-Up Jazz Festival in Augusta
Savannah Jazz Festival in Savannah
Savannah Music Festival in Savannah
Soiree: Jazz+Wine in Augusta

Idaho
Lionel Hampton Jazz Festival in Moscow
Sun Valley Jazz & Music Festival in Sun Valley

Illinois
Al Sears Jazz Festival in Macomb
Chicago Jazz Festival in Chicago
Elmhurst Jazz Festival in Elmhurst
Englewood Jazz Festival in Chicago
Hyde Park Jazz Festival in Chicago
Knox-Rootabaga Jazz Festival in Galesburg
South Shore Jazz Festival in Chicago
Umbrella Music Festival in Chicago

Indiana
Elkhart Jazz Festival in Elkhart
Indy Jazz Fest in Indianapolis
Notre Dame Collegiate Jazz Festival in Notre Dame
Purdue Jazz Festival in West Lafayette

Iowa
Bix Beiderbecke Memorial Jazz Festival in Davenport
Iowa City Jazz Festival in Iowa City

Kentucky
 Django Jamboree in Louisville
Louisiana
French Quarter Festival in New Orleans
Highland Jazz & Blues Festival in Shreveport
New Orleans Jazz & Heritage Festival in New Orleans
Satchmo SummerFest in New Orleans

Maryland
Capital Jazz Festival in Columbia
Frederick Jazz Festival in Frederick
Silver Spring Jazz Festival in Silver Spring

Massachusetts
Berklee Jazz Festival in Boston
Provincetown Jazz Festival in Provincetown
Tanglewood Jazz Festival in Tanglewood

Michigan
Detroit International Jazz Festival in Detroit 
Thornapple Arts Council Jazz Festival in Hastings, since 2003
River Raisin Jazz Festival in Monroe

Minnesota
Grand Marais Jazz Festival in Grand Marais, Cook County on the North Shore of Lake Superior
Minnesota Sur Seine in Minneapolis–Saint Paul
Twin Cities Jazz Festival in Minneapolis–Saint Paul

Missouri
Greater St. Louis Jazz Festival in St. Louis
Kansas City Blues and Jazz Festival in Kansas City
Scott Joplin International Ragtime Festival in Sedalia

Nebraska
Omaha Blues, Jazz, & Gospel Festival in Omaha

Nevada
Las Vegas City of Lights Jazz Festival in Las Vegas
Reno Jazz Festival in Reno

New Jersey
Asbury Park Jazz Festival in Asbury Park
Jersey City Jazz Festival in Jersey City
OSPAC Jazz Festival in West Orange
Red Bank Jazz & Blues Festival in Red Bank
 * Exit Zero Jazz Festival (Cape May, NJ)2013–present, 2 times annually

New York
Albany Riverfront Jazz Festival in Albany
Blue Note Jazz Festival in New York City
Essentially Ellington High School Jazz Band Competition and Festival at Lincoln Center in New York City
International Women in Jazz Festival in New York City
Jazz at Chautauqua in Chautauqua
Jazz in July Festival at 92nd Street Y in New York City
Lewiston Jazz Festival in Lewiston
New York Hot Jazz Festival in New York City
NYC Winter Jazzfest in New York City
Queen City Jazz Festival in Buffalo
Rochester International Jazz Festival in Rochester
Saratoga Jazz Festival (aka Freihofer's Jazz Festival) in Saratoga Springs
Southern Tier Jazz Festival in Horseheads
Vision Festival in New York City
The Warwick Valley Jazz Festival in Warwick
Jazz at the Lake: Lake George Jazz Weekend in upstate New York

North Carolina
 Duck Jazz Festival in Duck
 North Carolina Jazz Festival in Wilmington
 Pleasure Island Seafood, Blues & Jazz Festival in Kure Beach

Ohio
 Columbus Jazz and Rib Festival in Columbus

Oregon
 Oregon Coast Jazz
 Portland Jazz Festival in Portland

Pennsylvania
Berks Jazz Fest in Reading
RiverJazz Festival in Bethlehem
Westsylvania Jazz & Blues Festival in Indiana

Rhode Island
Newport Jazz Festival in Newport

South Carolina
Aiken Jazz Festival in Aiken
Jazz!Carolina Festival in Hartsville

South Dakota
Sioux Falls Jazz and Blues Festival in Sioux Falls

Tennessee
Franklin Jazz Festival in Franklin
Jazzanooga in Chattanooga
Watertown Jazz Festival in Watertown

Texas
Austin Area Jazz Festival in Austin
Beaumont Jazz & Blues Fest in Beaumont
Denton Arts and Jazz Festival in Denton
Fort Worth Music Festival, formerly Jazz By The Boulevard
Trinity Jazz Festival and Jazz Mass in Houston
West Texas Jazz Party in Odessa and Midland

Utah
Benny Golson Jazz Festival in Ephraim

Vermont
Burlington Discover Jazz Festival in Burlington
Pico Mountain Jazz Festival in Killington, Vermont

Virginia
Hampton Jazz Festival in Hampton

Washington
Ballard Jazz Festival in Seattle
Centrum (also known as Jazz Port Townsend)
Earshot Jazz Festival in Seattle

Wisconsin
 Great River Jazz Fest in La Crosse
 Jazz on the Vine in Elkhart Lake
 Kettle Moraine Jazz Festival in West Bend

Wyoming
 Kinser Jazz Festival in Casper

Puerto Rico 

Puerto Rico Heineken Jazz Fest
Ponce Jazz Festival

Uruguay
Festival Internacional de Jazz de Punta del Este, Punta del Este
Festival Jazz a la Calle (Jazz to the Streets), Mercedes
Jazz Tour Montevideo, Montevideo

Venezuela
Festival Internacional de Jazz en Barquisimeto, Barquisimeto, Venezuela

Asia

Azerbaijan

Baku International Jazz Festival in Baku

China
Beijing Jazz Festival in Beijing
Jazz-E Festival

Cyprus
International Kourion Festival
World of Jazz Festival at Aphrodite Hills in Kouklia

Georgia
Black Sea Jazz Festival in Batumi
Tbilisi Jazz Festival in Tbilisi

India
Delhi Jazz Festival in New Delhi
Indigo Jazz and Blues Festival
Lakshminarayana Global Music Festival

Indonesia
Ambon Jazz Plus Festival in Ambon Maluku
ASEAN Jazz Festival in Batam
Balikpapan Jazz Fiesta in Balikpapan, East Kalimantan
Bandung World Jazz Festival in Bandung, West Java
Indonesian Jass Festival in Jakarta
Jakarta International Jazz Festival - Jak.Jazz in Jakarta
Jakarta International Java Jazz Festival - Java Jazz in Jakarta
Jazz Goes To Campus in Jakarta
Jazz Gunung Mountain Jazz in Mount Bromo, East Java
Jazz Market By The Sea Festival in Bali
JazzSpeak Festival in Bandung, West Java
Just Jazz Festival in Surabaya, East Java
Kampoeng Jazz in Bandung, Jawa Barat
Mahakam Jazz Fiesta Samarinda in Samarinda, East Kalimantan
North Sumatra Jazz Festival in Medan, North Sumatra
Ngayogjazz Festival in Jogjakarta
Ramadhan Jazz Festival in Jakarta
 in Sikka, Flores

Japan
Ashiya Jazz Festival Ashiya Jazz Festival
Live under the sky in Tokyo
Mt. Fuji Jazz Festival in Yamanashi
Newport Jazz Festival in Madarao
Tokyo Jazz Plus in Tokyo

South Korea
Jarasum International Jazz Festival in Jarasum
Seoul Jazz Festival in Seoul

Malaysia
KL International Jazz & Arts Festival
Kota Kinabalu Jazz Festival
World Youth Jazz Festival
Penang Island Jazz Festival
Borneo Jazz Festival held in Miri, Sarawak
IPjazz Festival held in Bahru

Nepal
Jazzmandu in Kathmandu

Philippines
The Philippine International Jazz & Arts Festival

Singapore
 The Singapore International Jazz Festival

Thailand
Bangkok Jazz Festival in Bangkok
Hua Hin Jazz Festival in Hua Hin
Thailand International Jazz Conference in Salaya

Taiwan
Taichung Jazz Festival, Taichung, Taiwan

Israel
Red Sea Jazz Festival in Eilat
Super Jazz Ashdod in Ashdod Festival
Jerusalem Jazz Festival in Jerusalem

United Arab Emirates
Dubai International Jazz Festival

Europe

Austria
Jazzfestival Saalfelden in Saalfelden
Salzburger Jazz-Herbst in Salzburg
Brunner Jazz and Bluesfestival in Brunn am Gebirge bei Vienna

Belgium
Blue Note Festival in Ghent
Brussels Jazz Festival, in the Flagey building in Brussels
Django à Liberchies in Liberchies
Festival International de Jazz in Comblain-la-Tour
Golden River City Jazz Festival in Kortrijk
Jazz Bilzen
Jazz Middelheim in Antwerp

Bosnia and Herzegovina
Jazz Fest Sarajevo in Sarajevo

Bulgaria
International Jazz Festival in Bansko
Varna Jazz Days Festival in Varna,

Denmark
Aarhus International Jazz Festival in Aarhus
Copenhagen Jazz Festival in Copenhagen
Riverboat Jazz Festival in Silkeborg
Tversted Jazzy Days Jazz Festival in Tversted
Ribe jazz festival in Ribe

Estonia
Jazzkaar in Tallinn

Finland
April Jazz in Espoo
Baltic Jazz in Dalsbruk (Taalintehdas), Kimitoön
Imatra Big Band Festival in Imatra
Jazz-Espa in Helsinki
Jyväskylä Summer Jazz in Jyväskylä
Kaamosjazz in Inari
Kainuun Jazzkevät in Kajaani
Keitelejazz in Äänekoski
Kerava Jazz in Kerava
Kirjazz in Valkeakoski
Lahden Jazztori in Lahti
Pori Jazz in Pori
Rauma Summer Jazz in Rauma
Tampere Jazz Happening in Tampere
Turku Jazz in Turku
Vallijamit in Taavetti, Luumäki

France
Banlieues Bleues in Seine-Saint-Denis
CareFusion Jazz Festival in Paris
Charlie Jazz Festival in Vitrolles, Provence
Cognac Blues Passions in Cognac
Europa Jazz Festival in Le Mans
Fest Jazz in Châteauneuf-du-Faou
Festival International Django Reinhardt in Samois sur Seine
Jazz à Juan in Antibes
 Jazz à Toulon in Toulon
Jazz à Saint-Germain-des-Prés Paris in Paris
Jazz à Vienne in Vienne
Jazz Atlantique in Brest
Jazz aux Remparts in Bayonne
Jazz en tête in Clermont-Ferrand
Jazz in Marciac in Marciac
Jazz Oloron in Oloron-Sainte-Marie, Pyrénées Atlantiques
Jazz sous les pommiers in Coutances
Jazz sur son 31 in Toulouse
La Villette Jazz Festival in Paris
Musiques de Jazz et d'ailleurs in Amiens
Musiques Métisses in Angoulême
Nancy Jazz Pulsations in Nancy
Nice Jazz Festival in Nice
Palais en Jazz in Compiègne
Paris Jazz Festival in the Bois de Vincennes
Reims Jazz Festival in Reims
Sons d'hiver in Val-de-Marne
Tourcoing Jazz Festival in Tourcoing
Uzeste Musical in Uzeste

Germany
Enjoy Jazz in the Rhein-Neckar-Region: Heidelberg, Mannheim and Ludwigshafen
Internationales Dixieland Festival in Dresden
Internationales Jazzfestival Münster
Jazz Baltica in Salzau
JazzFest Berlin in Berlin
Jazzfestival Neuwied in Neuwied
Moers Festival in Moers
JAZZMEILE Festival in Thuringia
Jazzopen in Stuttgart
just music - Beyond Jazz Festival in Wiesbaden

Iceland
Reykjavík Jazz Festival in Reykjavík

Ireland
Bray Jazz Festival in Bray, County Wicklow
Cloughtoberfest in Cloughjordan, County Tipperary
Cork Jazz Festival in Cork City, County Cork
Galway Jazz Festival in Galway, County Galway
Harvest Time Blues in Monaghan, County Monaghan

Italy
Beat Onto Jazz Festival in Bitonto
Bologna Jazz Festival in Bologna
Fano Jazz by The Sea in Fano
Fara Music Festival in Fara Sabina
Garda Jazz Festival in Trentino
La Spezia Jazz Festival in La Spezia
Midsummer Jazz Concerts in Stresa
Roccella Jazz Festival in Roccella Jonica
Rome Jazz Festival in Rome
Siena Jazz Festival
Tetracordo Jazz Festival in Isernia
Time in Jazz in Berchidda
Torino Jazz Festival in Turin
Tuscia in Jazz in Bagnoregio
Udin&Jazz in Udine
Umbria Jazz in Perugia
Venezia Jazz Festival in Venice

Kosovo
Dam Jazz Festival
Prishtina Jazz Festival in Pristina

Latvia
RIGAS RITMI FESTIVAL in Riga
Saulkrasti Jazz Festival in Saulkrasti

Lithuania
Jazz Jaunystė in Elektrėnai
Birštonas jazz festival in Birštonas
Broma Jazz in Kėdainiai
Klaipėdos Pilies džiazo festivalis   in Klaipėda
Kaunas Jazz in Kaunas
Nida Jazz in Nida
VDU Jazz Jungtys in Kaunas
Vilnius Jazz in Vilnius
Vilnius Mama Jazz Festival in Vilnius

Malta
Malta Jazz Festival in Valletta

Moldova
Ethno Jazz Festival in Chișinău

Netherlands
Amersfoort Jazz in Amersfoort
Breda Jazz Festival in Breda
International Jazz Festival Enschede in Enschede
Jazz Festival Enkhuizen in Enkhuizen
Jazz in Duketown in 's-Hertogenbosch
Jazz Maastricht Festival in Maastricht
Meer Jazz Festival in Haarlemmermeer
Mondriaan Jazz Festival in The Hague
North Sea Jazz Festival formerly in The Hague, now in Rotterdam
Rhine Town Jazz Festival in Wageningen
Summer Jazz Festival in Leiden
Utrechts Jazz Festival in Utrecht
Wereld Jazz Dagen in Dordrecht

North Macedonia
Skopje Jazz Festival in Skopje

Norway
 Bodø Jazz Open in Bodø
 Canal Street in Arendal
 Djangofestival on Cosmopolite in Oslo
 DølaJazz in Lillehammer
 Finsejazz in Finse
 Ice Music Festival in Geilo
 Haugesunds jazz festival in Haugesund
 Kongsberg Jazzfestival in Kongsberg 
 MaiJazz in Stavanger 
 Moldejazz in Molde 
 Nattjazz in Bergen
 Nordlysfestivalen in Tromsø
 Oslo Jazzfestival in Oslo 
 Polarjazz in Longyearbyen 
 Punktfestivalen in Kristiansand 
 Sildajazz in Haugesund
 Soddjazz in Inderøy
 Trondheim Jazz Festival in Trondheim
 Vossajazz in Voss

Poland
Bielska Zadymka Jazzowa in Bielsko-Biała
Bydgoszcz Jazz Festival in Bydgoszcz
Easy Jazz Festival in Żory
Gorzów Jazz Celebration in Gorzów Wielkopolski
Jazz Jamboree in Warsaw
Jazz nad Odrą in Wrocław
Jazz Spring Częstochowa in Częstochowa
Jazz w Lesie in Sulęczyno
Jazz w Muzeum in Ostrów Wielkopolski
Jazz w Ruinach in Gliwice
Komeda Jazz Festival in Słupsk
Krakowska Jesień Jazzowa in Kraków
Warsaw Summer Jazz Days in Warsaw
International Piano Jazz Festival in Kalisz

Portugal
AlãoJazz in Alenquer
Almodôvar com Jazz in Almodôvar
Angra Jazz in Angra do Heroísmo
Braga Jazz in Braga
Cool Jazz fest in Oeiras
Douro Jazz in Vila Real
Encontros de Jazz de Évora in Évora
Est´Jazz in Estremóz
Festa do Jazz S.Luiz in Lisboa
Festival de Jazz de Espinho in Espinho
Festival de Jazz e Blues in Seia
Festival Internacional de Jazz de Alandroal in Alandroal
Festival Jazz de Albufeira in Albufeira
Festival Jazz Valado do Frades in Valado dos Frades
Festival Jazz´Abrir in Aljezur
Jazz N´Gaia in Vila Nova de Gaia
Jazzmin, Festival de Jazz de Aljustrel in Aljustrel
Funchal Jazz Festival in Funchal
Guimarães Jazz in Guimarães
Jazz Além Tejo in Vila Nova de Santo André
Jazz ao Centro in Coimbra
Jazz em Agosto in Lisboa
Jazz Minde in Minde
Jazz na Realva in Paredes de Coura
Jazz nas Alturas in Guarda
Jazz no Alto Mar in Nazaré
Jazz no Parque in Fundação Serralves
Mafra Jazz Fest in Mafra
Maio Jazz in Almodôvar
Matosinhos Jazz Festival in Matosinhos
Porta Jazz Festival in Porto
Portalegre Jazz Fest in Portalegre
Rendez Vous Jazz Fest in Setúbal
Seixal Jazz in Seixal
Sines em Jazz in Sines
TVedrasJazz in Torres Vedras
Tass Jazz in Odemira
Xôpana Jazz in Funchal

Romania
 Bucharest Masters of Jazz Festival in Bucharest
 Csíki Jazz - International Jazzfestival in Miercurea Ciuc
 EUROPAfest in Bucharest
 Festivalul Internaţional "Richard Oschanitzky" in Iaşi 
 Gărâna Jazz Festival in Gărâna, Caraș-Severin County
 International Jazz Day in Cluj-Napoca
 Jazz and More in Sibiu
 Jazzy Spring Festival Bucharest in Bucharest
  Roland Jazz Festival in Singeorz Bai
 Samfest Jazz in Satu Mare
 Sibiu Jazz Festival in Sibiu
 Timișoara Jazz Festival in Timișoara
 Transilvania Jazz Festival in Cluj-Napoca

Russia
GGJazz International Festival in Krasnodar
Sochi Jazz Festival
Jazz May in Penza
Jazz Province in Kursk and Moscow
MuzEnergo in Dubna
Rostov International Jazz Festival in Rostov-on-Don
Usadba.Jazz in Moscow
VR Jazz Festival in Moscow

Serbia
Nišville Jazz Festival in Niš
Novi Sad Jazz Festival in Novi Sad
International JazzFest in Kragujevac

Slovakia
 Bratislava Jazz Days
 JazzBratislavaDays

Slovenia
Džjezz International Jazz Festival in Celje
Jazz Camp Kranj in Kranj
Jazz Cerkno in Cerkno
Jazz Festival Ljubljana in Ljubljana

Spain
Badejazz in Badajoz
Festival de Jazz de Barcelona
Festival de Jazz de Ezcaray
Festival de Jazz de Madrid
Festival de Jazz de Terrassa
Festival de Jazz de Valencia
Festival de Jazz de Vitoria in Vitoria-Gasteiz
Festival Internacional de Jazz de San Javier
Sa Pobla festival Mallorca Jazz Festival
San Sebastian Jazz Festival 
Tarragona International Dixieland Festival in Tarragona

Sweden 
Stockholm Jazz Festival in Stockholm
Tradjazz Festival in Sölvesborg
Umeå Jazz Festival in Umeå

Switzerland 
Ascona Jazz Festival in Ascona
BeJazz Winter Festival in Bern
Cully Jazz Festival in Cully
Langnau Jazz Nights in Langnau i.E.
Lugano Jazz Festival in Lugano
Montreux Jazz Festival in Montreux
Jazz Festival Willisau in Willisau

Turkey
Afyon Jazz Festival in Afyon
Akbank Caz Festivali in Istanbul
Alanya Jazz Days in Alanya
Amatör Caz Müzisyenleri Festivali in Eskişehir
Ankara Jazz Festival in Ankara
Efes Pilsen Blues Festival in Ankara, Istanbul, Adana, İzmir, Bucharest Romania
Eskişehir Jazz Festival in Eskişehir
Istanbul Jazz Festival in Istanbul
İzmir European Jazz Festival in İzmir
ODTÜ Jazz Days in Ankara

Ukraine 
Alfa Jazz Fest in Lviv
Art jazz cooperation in Rivne, Lutsk
Jazz in Kyiv Festival in Kyiv
Koktebel Jazz Festival in Koktebel, Crimea
Live in Blue Bay Jazz Festival in Crimea
Master-Jam Fest in Odessa
Am I Jazz? Festival in Kyiv

United Kingdom
Aberdeen Jazz Festival in Aberdeen in Scotland
Aberjazz - Fishguard Jazz'n'Blues Festival in Pembrokeshire, Wales
Appleby Jazz Festival
Bath International Music Festival in Bath
 Birmingham Interrnational Jazz Festival in Birmingham http://www.birminghamjazzfestival.com
Brecon Jazz Festival in Wales
Bude Jazz Festival in Cornwall
Callander Jazz and Blues Festival in Scotland
Canary Wharf Jazz Festival in London
Cheltenham Jazz Festival in Cheltenham
Chippy Jazz and Music (CJAM) Festival in Chipping Norton, Oxfordshire 
City of Derry Jazz and Big Band Festival in Northern Ireland
Ealing Jazz Festival in Ealing, London
Edinburgh Jazz & Blues Festival 
Glasgow International Jazz Festival in Glasgow
Glenn Miller Festival Of Swing, Jazz & Jive!! in Clapham, Bedfordshire
Ipswich Jazz Festival in Ipswich, Suffolk
Keswick Jazz Festival in Lake District
 Llandudno Jazz Festival in North Wales
London Jazz Festival in London
Love Supreme Jazz Festival in Glynde Place, East Sussex
Manchester Jazz Festival in Manchester
 Margate Jazz Festival
Marsden Jazz Festival, West Yorks. 
Nairn International Jazz Festival in Scotland
Naturist Foundation Jazz Festival in Orpington, Kent
The Rye International Jazz Festival in Rye, East Sussex
Scarborough Jazz Festival
Swansea International Jazz Festival
TW12 Jazz Festival
Whitley Bay International Jazz Festival in Whitley Bay, North Tyneside

Oceania

Australia
 Australian Jazz Convention, alternating cities in Australia
 Dingo Creek Jazz and Blues Festival, Traveston, Queensland
 Grampians Jazz Festival, Halls Gap, Victoria (defunct)
 Melbourne International Jazz Festival, Victoria
 Generations In Jazz, Mount Gambier, South Australia
 Perth International Jazz Festival
 Wagga Wagga Jazz Festival, Wagga Wagga, New South Wales (defunct)
 Wangaratta Festival of Jazz, Wangaratta, Victoria
 Devonport Jazz, Tasmania
 Marysville Jazz and Blues Weekend, Marysville, Victoria

New Zealand
 National Jazz Festival in Tauranga, Tauranga, New Zealand
 New Zealand International Jazz & Blues Festival in Christchurch, New Zealand
 Wellington Jazz Festival in Wellington, New Zealand
 Taupō Jazz Festival in Taupo, New Zealand

Samoa
Samoa 2010 International Jazz and Blues Festival, Samoa

See also
 
Jazz improvisation

Related lists
 List of years in jazz
 List of historic rock festivals
 List of jam band music festivals
 List of music festivals
 List of reggae festivals

Related categories
Category:Music festivals
Category:Jazz festivals
Category:Blues festivals
Category:Experimental music festivals
Category:Hip hop music festivals
Category:Rock festivals
Category:Reggae festivals

References

External links

 Festival Archive - Comprehensive Jazz Festival Listings

 
Jazz
Festivals

de:Liste von Jazzfestivals in Deutschland, Österreich und der Schweiz